Cock rock is a genre of rock music that emphasizes an aggressive form of male sexuality. The style developed in the later 1960s, came to prominence in the 1970s and 1980s, and continues into the present day.

Characteristics 
Cock rock is a musical genre. Philip Auslander uses Simon Frith's description of cock rock characteristics:
[C]ock-rock performance means an explicit, crude, 'masterful' expression of sexuality ... Cock-rock performers are aggressive, boastful, constantly drawing audience attention to their prowess and control. Their bodies are on display ... mikes and guitars are phallic symbols (or else caressed like female bodies), the music is loud, rhythmically insistent, built around techniques of arousal and release. Lyrics are assertive and arrogant, but the exact words are less significant than the vocal styles involved, the shrill shouting and screaming.

Use of the term 
The meaning of the term cock rock has changed over time. It was first mentioned by an anonymous author in the New York-based underground feminist publication Rat in 1970 to describe the male-dominated music industry, and became a synonym for hard rock, emphasizing the aggressive expression of male sexuality, often misogynist lyrics and use of phallic imagery. The term was used by sociologists Simon Frith and Angela McRobbie in 1978 to point to the contrast between the male-dominated subculture of cock rock which was "aggressive, dominating and boastful" and the more feminized teenybop stars of pop music. Led Zeppelin have been described as "the quintessential purveyors of 'cock rock'". Other formative acts include the Rolling Stones, The Who and Jim Morrison of The Doors.

In 1981, Frith described the characteristics of cock rock in a way that could apply to female performers, not just male ones. In 2004, Auslander used this description of cock-rock characteristics to show that Suzi Quatro (the first female bass player to become a major rockstar) is a female cock-rocker.

Since the 1980s, the term has been sometimes interchangeable with hair metal or glam metal. Examples of this genre include: Mötley Crüe, Ratt, Warrant, Extreme, Cinderella, Pretty Boy Floyd, Jackyl, L.A. Guns, and Poison. Despite the name, many of these bands had or have large numbers of female fans. The spoof documentary This Is Spinal Tap is an acclaimed parody of the genre. In the 21st century, there was a revival of the genre with the sleaze metal movement in Sweden, with acts including Vains of Jenna.

See also 
Arena rock
Heavy metal
Hard rock

References

External links 
  (Female cock rockers from an American feminist point of view.)

20th-century music genres
21st-century music genres
Rock music genres
Men and sexuality
British rock music genres